How To Avoid Everything is a 2014 Dutch comedy film directed by Michiel ten Horn. The film won 3 Golden Calves for Best Feature Film, Best Actor (Naber) and Best Screenplay.

Plot
Thijs, an immature man in his thirties, refuses to grow up and lives the life of a student.

Cast 
 Gijs Naber als Thijs 
 Yannick van de Velde als Walter 
  als Lisa 
  als Simone
  als Julie

References

External links 

2014 comedy films
Dutch comedy films
Films directed by Michiel ten Horn
2010s Dutch-language films